Fiji, having made its Olympic debut at the 1956 Summer Games, has competed at fourteen Summer Games and three Winter Games. Its athletes have taken part in archery, athletics, boxing, football, judo, sailing, shooting, swimming, weightlifting and rugby sevens.

At the 2016 Summer Olympics, the Fiji rugby team won a gold medal, the country's inaugural Olympic Medal, which they retained at the 2020 Olympics. As of 2020, no other nation won a gold medal in the Olympic men's rugby sevens.

History

Qualifications
Prior to the introduction of rugby sevens, Fiji's national sport, at the 2016 Summer Olympics, only two athletes had taken part in Olympic Games through reaching the required standards to qualify, rather than by receiving a wild card invitation. They are Makelesi Bulikiobo, who qualified for the women's 400 metre sprint at the 2008 Games in Beijing, and Leslie Copeland, who with a throw of 80.45 metres qualified for the men's javelin event at the 2012 Games in London.

Invitations
Fiji's Winter Olympians were Rusiate Rogoyawa in cross-country skiing (1988, 1994) and Laurence Thoms in alpine skiing (2002), both participating by invite.

Notable participants
Fiji has had two competitors appear at five separate Summer Olympic Games. Windsurfer Tony Philp competed in five consecutive Games from Los Angeles in 1984 (when he was just 15 years of age) to Sydney 2000, finishing 10th on two occasions. Swimmer Carl Probert matched the feat in Beijing 2008, having first appeared at the 1992 Summer Olympics at Barcelona.

Medalling
Fiji earned its first ever Olympic medal at the 2016 Summer Olympics in Rio, a gold in Men's Rugby Sevens.

As a result, the winning team broke out in a victory song that drew considerable online attention and Fiji declared a national holiday for the win.

At the 2020 Olympics the team successfully defended its title, while the women's team took a bronze medal.

Medal tables

Medals by Summer Games

Medals by Winter Games

Medals by Summer sport

List of medalists

Summer sports

Multiple medalists

See also

 List of flag bearers for Fiji at the Olympics
 Tropical nations at the Winter Olympics
 Fiji at the Paralympics

References

External links
 
 
 

 
Olympics